Konec cesty  is a 1959 Czechoslovak crime drama film, directed by Miroslav Cikán. It stars  Martin Růžek, Alena Vránová, and Vladimír Ráž.

Cast
Martin Růžek as Josef Lachman
Alena Vránová as Eva Kostková
Vladimír Ráž as Jindra Kostka
Rudolf Deyl as Rokos
Eva Klepácová as Ruzena
Josef Bek as kapitán Lukes
Gustav Heverle as porucík Bouchal
Oldrich Vykypel as porucík Novák
Frantisek Miska as porucík Hanák
Miloš Kopecký as Jirák

References

External links
Konec cesty  at the Internet Movie Database

1960 films
1960 crime drama films
Films directed by Miroslav Cikán
Czechoslovak crime drama films
Czech crime drama films
1960s Czech films